The Radio Nikkei Sho (Japanese ラジオNIKKEI賞) is a Grade 3 horse race for three-year-old Thoroughbreds run in late June or early July over a distance of 1800 metres at Fukushima Racecourse.

The race was first run in 1952 and was promoted to Grade 3 status in 1984. The race was run at Tokyo Racecourse and Nakayama Racecourse before moving to its current venue in 1979. It was run at Niigata Racecourse in 1989, Tokyo in 2000 and Nakayama in 2011.

Winners since 2000  

 The 2000 race took place at Tokyo
 The 2011 race took place at Nakayama

Earlier winners

 1984 - Suzu Parade
 1985 - Derby Rich
 1986 - Dyna Cosmos
 1987 - Leo Tenzan
 1988 - Takara Flash
 1989 - Daiwa Gehrig
 1990 - Tsurumai Aswan
 1991 - Twin Turbo
 1992 - Shinko Lovely
 1993 - A P Grand Prix
 1994 - Yashima Sovereign
 1995 - Prest Symboli
 1996 - Big Baillamont
 1997 - Air Guts
 1998 - Biwa Takehide
 1999 - Silk Guardian

See also
 Horse racing in Japan
 List of Japanese flat horse races

References

Turf races in Japan